The Sultan Yahya Petra Bridge (Jawi: جمبتن سلطان يحي ڤيترا) is a major bridge in Kota Bharu, Kelantan, Malaysia crossing Kelantan River. Construction began in 1965 and was completed in 1967, by renowned builder Kien Huat Private Limited, a family firm of Tan Sri Lim Goh Tong. It was opened on 1967 by the late Sultan of Kelantan. Almarhum Sultan Yahya Petra ibni Almarhum Sultan Ibrahim. The bridge was originally a toll bridge making the first toll bridge in Malaysia.

Current developments

Construction of the Sultan Yahya Petra Second Bridge
The Sultan Yahya Petra Second Bridge project consists of a pair of bridges built at the left and right of the original bridge and a 1-km flyover built on top of the existing Federal Route 3. Construction began on 2009 and was completed in 2012. The bridge becomes the only triple-carriageway bridge in the country, where the original bridge remains as a two-way bridge, while the new bridges constructed at both sides of the original bridge carry one-way traffic each.

See also
 Transport in Malaysia

References

External links 
  Jambatan Sultan Yahya Petra ditutup

1967 establishments in Malaysia
Bridges completed in 1967
Bridges in Kelantan
Former toll bridges in Malaysia
Kota Bharu